Rotary Oceania Medical Aid for Children (ROMAC) is a charity which provides treatment in Australia and New Zealand for children from developing countries in the Oceania region in the form of life-giving or dignity-restoring surgery not accessible to them in their home country. It is an organization established in collaboration with Australian and New Zealand Rotary Clubs. Rotarians raise all funds and provide voluntary work for ROMAC.

History
In 1988, Barrie Cooper, a Rotarian from Bendigo, Australia, went on a humanitarian visit to Fiji and found the local surgical facilities inadequate for treating children.    He had the idea of getting his Rotary club to sponsor children from Oceania to be brought to Australia to be treated by Australian surgeons. Other Rotary clubs subsequently joined in, followed by clubs in New Zealand. 
ROMAC became an Australian public company registered as a charity with deductible-gift-recipient status in 2002.
Former test cricketer Max Walker was the patron of ROMAC up to this death in 2016 and did much to promote the organization.

Services provided by ROMAC
A doctor in one of the Oceania countries can refer a child to ROMAC. However, referrals often come from Australian or New Zealand medical personnel who have gone to an Oceania location to do some voluntary medical work and come across a patient who could not be treated locally. The surgical intervention must not be available locally, has to be life-saving or dignity-restoring, the cost is affordable, and no long-term care of the patient is needed. 
ROMAC organizes and pays for visas, passports, accommodation, hospital costs and clothing, while offering emotional and practical support. Rotarians volunteer to accommodate the child (when it is not in hospital) and the accompanying family member. ROMAC also provides interpreters when needed. 

ROMAC has a memorandum of understanding with some major hospitals to provide free care for a number of children. Due to the COVID-19 pandemic, the program of bringing children to Australia and New Zealand was halted in 2020.

As of 2020, ROMAC had assisted over 500 patients under the age of 15.

Key people
Chairman of the Board: Ian "D'Arcy" Wilson;

Patrons: Max Walker (until 2016), Past Rotary International President Bill Boyd (current)

References

External links 
 ROMAC

Rotary International
Health charities in Australia